Bruno Arcari (born 1 January 1942) is a retired Italian light welterweight boxer who fought from 1964 to 1978.

Biography

He came to the 1964 Olympics as a national champion and a bronze medalist of the 1963 European Championships, but was injured in the opening bout and had to withdraw. After that he turned professional, and again lost his first match by injury. He had only one loss further in his career, also by injury, and won 70 bouts, 38 of them by knockout. Arcari held the European title in 1968 by beating Austrian boxer Johann Orsolics, via a twelfth round stoppage, he would go onto defend the title four times. On 31 January 1970 captured the WBC world title after defeating Filipino boxer Pedro Adigue via a unanimous decision victory. Acari would reign as champion for four years & defended his title 9 times including against Brazilian boxer Everaldo Costa Azevedo & Spanish boxer Antonio Ortiz. He relinquished it 1973 to move up to the welterweight class, but did not fight for a major title until his retirement in 1978. He later managed top professional fighters in Italy.

Awards

On 7 May 2015, in the presence of the President of Italian National Olympic Committee (CONI), Giovanni Malagò, was inaugurated in the Olympic Park of the Foro Italico in Rome, along Viale delle Olimpiadi, the Walk of Fame of Italian sport, consisting of 100 tiles that chronologically report names of the most representative athletes in the history of Italian sport. On each tile are the name of the sportsman, the sport in which he distinguished himself and the symbol of CONI. One of the tiles is dedicated to Bruno Arcari.

Professional boxing record

See also
List of world light-welterweight boxing champions

References

External links

CONI honoured athlete website (in Italian)

 

1942 births
Living people
Italian male boxers
Sportspeople from Lazio
Southpaw boxers
Mediterranean Games gold medalists for Italy
Mediterranean Games medalists in boxing
Competitors at the 1963 Mediterranean Games
Olympic boxers of Italy
Boxers at the 1964 Summer Olympics
European Boxing Union champions
World Boxing Council champions
World light-welterweight boxing champions